In quantum field theory, and in the significant subfields of quantum electrodynamics (QED) and quantum chromodynamics (QCD), the two-body Dirac equations (TBDE) of constraint dynamics provide a three-dimensional yet manifestly covariant reformulation of the Bethe–Salpeter equation for two spin-1/2 particles. Such a reformulation is necessary since without it, as shown by Nakanishi, the Bethe–Salpeter equation possesses negative-norm solutions arising from the presence of an essentially relativistic degree of freedom, the relative time. These "ghost" states have spoiled the naive interpretation of the Bethe–Salpeter equation as a quantum mechanical wave equation. The two-body Dirac equations of constraint dynamics rectify this flaw. The forms of these equations can not only be derived from quantum field theory  they can also be derived purely in the context of Dirac's constraint dynamics  and relativistic mechanics and quantum mechanics. Their structures, unlike the more familiar two-body Dirac equation of Breit, which is a single equation, are that of two simultaneous quantum relativistic wave equations. A single two-body Dirac equation similar to the Breit equation can be derived from the TBDE.  Unlike the Breit equation, it is manifestly covariant and free from the types of singularities that prevent a strictly nonperturbative treatment of the Breit equation. 
In applications of the TBDE to QED, the two particles interact by way of four-vector potentials derived from the field theoretic electromagnetic interactions between the two particles. In applications to QCD, the two particles interact by way of four-vector potentials and Lorentz invariant scalar interactions, derived in part from the field theoretic chromomagnetic interactions between the quarks and in part by phenomenological considerations. As with the Breit equation a sixteen-component spinor Ψ is used.

Equations

For QED, each equation has the same structure as the ordinary one-body Dirac equation in the presence of an external electromagnetic field, given by the 4-potential . For QCD, each equation has the same structure as the ordinary one-body Dirac equation in the presence of an external field similar to the electromagnetic field and an additional external field given by in terms of a Lorentz invariant scalar . In natural units: those two-body equations have the form.

where, in coordinate space, pμ is the 4-momentum, related to the 4-gradient by (the metric used here is )

and γμ are the gamma matrices. The two-body Dirac equations (TBDE) have the property that if
one of the masses becomes very large, say  then the 16-component Dirac equation reduces to the 4-component one-body Dirac equation for particle one in an external potential.

In SI units:

where c is the speed of light and

Natural units will be used below. A tilde symbol is used over the two sets of potentials to indicate that they may have additional gamma matrix dependencies not present in the one-body Dirac equation.  Any coupling constants such as the electron charge are embodied in the vector potentials.

Constraint dynamics and the TBDE

Constraint dynamics applied to the TBDE requires a particular form of mathematical consistency: the two Dirac operators must commute with each other. This is plausible if one views the two equations as two compatible constraints on the wave function. (See the discussion below on constraint dynamics.) If the two operators did not commute, (as, e.g., with the coordinate and momentum operators ) then the constraints would not be compatible (one could not e.g., have a wave function that satisfied both  and ). This mathematical consistency or compatibility leads to three important properties of the TBDE. (The variable  is the total energy in the c.m. frame.) Stated another way, the relative time is eliminated in a covariant way.

This implies that in the c.m. frame , which has zero time component.

Secondly, the mathematical consistency condition also eliminates the relative energy in the c.m. frame. It does this by imposing on each Dirac operator a structure such that in a particular combination they lead to this interaction independent form, eliminating in a covariant way the relative energy.

In this expression  is the relative momentum having the form  for equal masses. In the c.m. frame, the time component  of the relative momentum, that is the relative energy, is thus eliminated. in the sense that .

These extra terms correspond to additional recoil spin-dependence not present in the one-body Dirac equation and vanish when one of the particles becomes very heavy (the so-called static limit).

More on constraint dynamics: generalized mass shell constraints 

Constraint dynamics arose from the work of Dirac  and Bergmann. This section
shows how the elimination of relative time and energy takes place in the
c.m. system for the simple system of two relativistic spinless particles.
Constraint dynamics was first applied to the classical relativistic two particle system by Todorov, Kalb
and Van Alstine, Komar, and Droz–Vincent. With constraint dynamics, these authors found a consistent and covariant approach to relativistic canonical Hamiltonian mechanics that also evades the Currie–Jordan–Sudarshan "No Interaction" theorem.  That theorem states that without fields, one cannot have a relativistic Hamiltonian dynamics. Thus, the same covariant three-dimensional approach which allows the quantized version of constraint dynamics to remove quantum ghosts simultaneously circumvents at the classical level the C.J.S. theorem. Consider a constraint on the otherwise independent coordinate and momentum four vectors, written in the form .  The symbol is called a weak equality and implies that the constraint is to be imposed only after any needed Poisson brackets are performed. In the presence of such constraints, the total
Hamiltonian  is obtained from the Lagrangian  by adding to the Legendre Hamiltonian  the sum of the constraints times an appropriate set of Lagrange multipliers .

,

This total Hamiltonian is traditionally called the Dirac Hamiltonian.
Constraints arise naturally from parameter invariant actions of the form

In the case of four vector and Lorentz scalar interactions for a single
particle the Lagrangian is

The canonical momentum is

and by squaring leads to the generalized mass shell condition or generalized
mass shell constraint

Since, in this case, the Legendre Hamiltonian vanishes

the Dirac Hamiltonian is simply the generalized mass constraint (with no
interactions it would simply be the ordinary mass shell constraint)

One then postulates that for two bodies the Dirac Hamiltonian is the sum of
two such mass shell constraints,

 

that is

and that each constraint  be constant in the proper time associated with 

Here the weak equality means that the Poisson bracket could result in terms proportional one of the constraints, the classical Poisson brackets for the relativistic two-body system being defined by

To see the consequences of having each constraint be a constant of the
motion, take, for example

Since  and
 and  one has

The simplest solution to this is

which leads to (note the equality in this case is not a weak one in that no constraint need be imposed after the Poisson bracket is worked out)

(see Todorov, and Wong and Crater  ) with the same  defined
above.

Quantization 

In addition to replacing classical dynamical variables by their quantum counterparts, quantization of the constraint mechanics takes place by replacing the constraint on the dynamical variables with a restriction on the wave function

,
.

The first set of equations for i = 1, 2 play the role for spinless particles that the two Dirac equations play for spin-one-half particles. The classical Poisson brackets are replaced by commutators

Thus

and we see in this case that the constraint formalism leads to the vanishing commutator of the wave operators for the two particles.  This is the analogue of the claim stated earlier that the two Dirac operators commute with one another.

Covariant elimination of the relative energy 

The vanishing of the above commutator ensures that the dynamics is
independent of the relative time in the c.m. frame.  In order to
covariantly eliminate the relative energy, introduce the relative momentum  defined by

 

 
The above definition of the relative momentum forces the orthogonality of the total
momentum and the relative momentum,

,

where 
 

 
are the projections of the momenta  and  along the direction
of the total momentum .

Thus on these states  
 

 .

The equation  describes both the c.m. motion and the
internal relative motion. To characterize the former motion, observe that
since the potential  depends only on the difference of the two
coordinates

.

Thus, the total momentum  is a constant of motion and 
 is an eigenstate state characterized by a total momentum 
. In the c.m. system  with  the
invariant center of momentum (c.m.) energy. Thus

and so  is also an eigenstate of c.m. energy operators for each of
the two particles, 
 

.
 
The relative momentum then satisfies

,

so that

,
 ,

If instead one chooses to define (for a more general choice see Horwitz),

 

 
independent of the wave function, then
 
  
 
 
and it is straight forward to show that the constraint Eq.() leads
directly to:

This conforms with the earlier claim on the
vanishing of the relative energy in the c.m. frame made in conjunction with
the TBDE. In the second choice the c.m. value of the relative energy is
not defined as zero but comes from the original generalized mass shell
constraints.  The above equations for the relative and constituent
four-momentum are the relativistic analogues of the non-relativistic equations

,
,
.

Covariant eigenvalue equation for internal motion 

 

where

Eq.() contains both the total momentum  [through the ] and the relative momentum . Using Eq., one obtains the eigenvalue equation

so that  becomes the standard triangle
function displaying exact relativistic two-body kinematics:

With the above constraint Eqs.() on  then  where . This allows 
writing Eq. in the form of an eigenvalue equation

having a structure very similar to that of the ordinary three-dimensional
nonrelativistic Schrödinger equation. It is a manifestly covariant
equation, but at the same time its three-dimensional structure is evident.
The four-vectors  and  have only
three independent components since

The similarity to the three-dimensional structure of the nonrelativistic
Schrödinger equation can be made more explicit by writing the equation in
the c.m. frame in which

,
,
.

Comparison of the resultant form 

with the time independent Schrödinger equation

makes this similarity explicit.

The two-body relativistic Klein–Gordon equations 

A plausible structure for the quasipotential  can be found by
observing that the one-body Klein–Gordon equation    takes the form  when one
In the
two-body case, separate classical  and quantum field theory 
arguments show that when one includes world scalar and
vector interactions then  depends on two underlying invariant
functions  and  through the two-body Klein–Gordon-like potential
form with the same general structure, that is

Those field theories further yield the c.m. energy dependent forms 

and

ones that Tododov introduced as the relativistic reduced mass
and effective particle energy for a two-body system. Similar to what
happens in the nonrelativistic two-body problem, in the relativistic case
we have the motion of this effective particle taking place as if it were in
The two kinematical
Einstein condition 

If one introduces the four-vectors, including a vector interaction 

and scalar interaction , then the following classical minimal
constraint form

reproduces

Notice, that the interaction in this "reduced particle" constraint depends
vector interaction and one the scalar interaction.

Is there a set of two-body Klein–Gordon equations analogous to the two-body Dirac
equations? The classical relativistic constraints analogous to the quantum
two-body Dirac equations (discussed in the introduction) and that have the same structure as the above
Klein–Gordon one-body form are

Defining structures that display time-like vector and scalar interactions

gives

Imposing

and using the constraint , reproduces Eqs.() provided

The corresponding Klein–Gordon equations are

and each, due to the constraint  is equivalent to

Hyperbolic versus external field form of the two-body Dirac equations 

For the two body system there are numerous covariant forms of interaction. 
The simplest way of looking at these is from the point of view of the gamma
matrix structures of the corresponding interaction vertices of the single
particle exchange diagrams.  For scalar, pseudoscalar, vector,
pseudovector, and tensor exchanges those matrix structures are respectively 

in which

The form of the Two-Body Dirac equations which most readily incorporates
each or any number of these intereractions in concert is the so-called hyperbolic form of the TBDE
.  For combined scalar and vector
interactions those forms ultimately reduce to the ones given in the first
set of equations of this article.  Those equations are called the external
field-like forms because their appearances are individually the same as
those for the usual one-body Dirac equation in the presence of external
vector and scalar fields.

The most general hyperbolic form for compatible TBDE is

where  represents any invariant interaction singly or in
combination.  It has a matrix structure in addition to coordinate
dependence. Depending on what that matrix structure is one has either
scalar, pseudoscalar, vector, pseudovector, or tensor interactions.  The
satisfying 

This, in turn leads to the two compatibility conditions 

and 

provided that  These compatibility
That
matrix structure is determined by the type of vertex-vertex structure 
incorporated in the interaction.  For the two types of invariant
interactions  emphasized in this article they are

For general independent scalar and vector interactions

The vector interaction specified by the above matrix structure for an electromagnetic-like interaction would correspond to the Feynman gauge.

If  one inserts Eq.()  into  and brings the free
Dirac operator  to the right of the matrix hyperbolic functions
and uses standard gamma matrix commutators and anticommutators and  one arrives at 

in which 

playing the roles that  and  do in the single particle
Dirac equation  

Over and above the usual kinetic part  and 
time-like vector and scalar potential portions, the spin-dependent
modifications involving 
and the last set of derivative terms are two-body recoil effects absent for
the one-body Dirac equation but essential for the compatibility
(consistency) of the two-body  equations.  The connections between what
are designated as the vertex invariants  and the
mass and energy potentials  are  

Comparing Eq.() with the first equation of this article one finds
that the spin-dependent vector interactions are 

Note that the first portion of the vector potentials is timelike (parallel
The spin-dependent scalar potentials  are 

the Todorov effective external potential forms (as seen in the above section
on the two-body Klein Gordon equations) and at the same time displays the
correct static limit form for the Pauli reduction to Schrödinger-like
form.  The choice for these parameterizations (as with the two-body Klein
Gordon equations) is closely tied to classical or quantum field
theories for separate scalar and vector interactions. This
amounts to working in the Feynman gauge with the simplest relation between
space- and timelike parts of the vector interaction,.
The mass and energy potentials are respectively 

so that

Applications and limitations 

The TBDE can be readily applied to two body systems such as positronium, muonium, hydrogen-like atoms, quarkonium, and the two-nucleon system.  These applications involve two particles only and do not involve creation or annihilation of particles beyond the two.  They involve only elastic processes.  Because of the connection between the potentials used in the TBDE and the corresponding quantum field theory, any radiative correction to the lowest order interaction can be incorporated into those potentials.  To see how this comes about, consider by contrast how one computes scattering amplitudes without quantum field theory.  With no quantum field theory one must come upon potentials by classical arguments or phenomenological considerations.  Once one has the potential  between two particles, then one can compute the scattering amplitude  from the Lippmann–Schwinger equation 

,

Because of the similarity between the Schrödinger equation Eq.  and the relativistic constraint equation,one can derive the same type of equation as the above

,

called the quasipotential equation with a  very similar to that given in the Lippmann–Schwinger equation. The difference is that with the quasipotential equation, one starts with the scattering amplitudes  of quantum field theory, as determined from Feynman diagrams and deduces the quasipotential Φ perturbatively.
The relatively simple solution to the problem of relative time and energy from the generalized mass shell constraint for two particles, has no simple extension, such as presented here with the  variable, to either two particles in an external field  or to 3 or more particles.  Sazdjian has presented a recipe for this extension when the particles are confined and cannot split into clusters of a smaller number of particles with no inter-cluster interactions   Lusanna has developed an approach, one that does not involve generalized mass shell constraints with no such restrictions, which extends to N bodies with or without fields.  It is formulated on spacelike hypersurfaces and when restricted to the family of hyperplanes orthogonal to the total timelike momentum gives rise to a covariant intrinsic 1-time formulation (with no relative time variables) called the "rest-frame instant form" of dynamics,

See also

 Breit equation
 4-vector
 Dirac equation
 Dirac equation in the algebra of physical space
 Dirac operator
 Electromagnetism
 Kinetic momentum
 Many body problem
 Invariant mass
 Particle physics
Positronium
 Ricci calculus
 Special relativity
 Spin
 Quantum entanglement
 Relativistic quantum mechanics

References 

 
 Various forms of radial equations for the Dirac two-body problem W. Królikowski (1991), Institute of theoretical physics (Warsaw, Poland)
 

Quantum field theory
Mathematical physics
Equations of physics
Dirac equation